
Gmina Wieniawa is a rural gmina (administrative district) in Przysucha County, Masovian Voivodeship, in east-central Poland.

Villages
Gmina Wieniawa contains the villages and settlements of Brudnów, Głogów, Jabłonica, Kaleń, Kamień Duży, Kamień Mały, Kłudno, Kochanów Wieniawski, Komorów, Konary, Koryciska, Plec, Pogroszyn, Romualdów, Ryków, Skrzynno, Sokolniki Mokre, Sokolniki Suche, Wieniawa, Wola Brudnowska, Wydrzyn, Zadąbrów, Zagórze, Zawady and Żuków.

Neighbouring gminas
Gmina Wieniawa is bordered by the gminas of Borkowice, Chlewiska, Orońsko, Przysucha, Przytyk, Szydłowiec and Wolanów.

References
Polish official population figures 2006

Wieniawa
Przysucha County